Transcription factor HIVEP2 is a protein that in humans is encoded by the HIVEP2 gene.

Function 

Members of the ZAS family, such as ZAS2 (HIVEP2), are large proteins that contain a ZAS domain, a modular protein structure consisting of a pair of C2H2 zinc fingers with an acidic-rich region and a serine/threonine-rich sequence. These proteins bind specific DNA sequences, including the kappa-B motif (GGGACTTTCC), in the promoters and enhancer regions of several genes and viruses, including human immunodeficiency virus (HIV). ZAS genes span more than 150 kb and contain at least 10 exons, one of which is longer than 5.5 kb (Allen and Wu, 2004).[supplied by OMIM]

References

Further reading

External links 
 

Transcription factors